"Rendezvous in Black" was an American television play broadcast live on October 18, 1956, as part of the CBS television series, Playhouse 90.

Plot
Johnny Marr's fiancee is killed by a whisky bottle thrown from an airplane. Marr seeks revenge by killing the loved ones of the passengers on the flight.

Cast

 Franchot Tone as Johnny Marr
 Laraine Day as Florence Strickland
 Boris Karloff as Ward Allen
 Tom Drake as Johnny Mark
 Viveca Lindfors as Johnny Mark
 Elizabeth Patterson as Mrs. Middleton

Frank Lovejoy hosted the program.

Production
Martin Manulis was the producer and John Frankenheimer the director. It was Frankenheimer's second directing credit on Playhouse 90 following Forbidden Area.

James P. Cavanagh wrote the teleplay based on the novel, Rendezvous in Black (1948), by Cornell Woolrich.

Reception
In The New York Times, Jack Gould wrote that Playhouse 90 had reverted to "grade B movie material."

References

1956 American television episodes
Playhouse 90 (season 1) episodes
1956 television plays